The Ministry of Religious Affairs (MORA or MoRA; , KHEU) is a cabinet-level ministry in the government of Brunei which is responsible for the propagation of Islam and its upholding as the state religion, as well as oversees the Islamic religious education in the country. It is currently led by a minister and a deputy minister, whereby the incumbents are Badaruddin Othman and Pengiran Mohd Tashim Pengiran Hassan respectively. The ministry is headquartered in Bandar Seri Begawan.

History 

The department was established on 29 September 1959, initially as the Department of Religious Affairs. On 21 October 1970, the construction of their new B$375,000 headquarters were completed in Tutong, near Hassanal Bolkiah Mosque.

Budget 
In the fiscal year 2021–2022, the ministry had been allocated a budget of B$263 million, a two percent increase from the previous year.

Ministers

Notes

References

External links 
  

Religious organisations based in Brunei
Religious Affairs